The Baza Outdoor Oven is a 20th-century version of a traditional hotnu, or outside oven, on the island of Guam. This oven is located at the end of Beatrice Baza Drive in the village of Yona. It was built in 1952 out of brick and concrete, but is based on traditional forms that have been in use on Guam since they were introduced by the Spanish in the 17th century. The interior of the vault is made out of heat-resistant bricks, while the exterior is finished in cement. The oven was used by heating it until the bricks were white, after which the burning materials were removed, the food to be cooked was added, and the main door was closed. This oven is large enough to roast four pigs.

The oven was listed on the National Register of Historic Places in 2010.

See also
 Paulino Outdoor Oven
 Quan Outdoor Oven
 Won Pat Outdoor Oven
 National Register of Historic Places listings in Guam

References

Buildings and structures on the National Register of Historic Places in Guam
Ovens
Buildings and structures completed in 1952
1952 establishments in Guam